Bori is a town and arrondissement located in the N’Dali commune of the Borgou Department of Benin.

References

Populated places in Benin
Arrondissements of Benin